A semi-drying oil is an oil which partially hardens when it is exposed to air.  This is as opposed to a drying oil, which hardens completely, or a non-drying oil, which does not harden at all.  Oils with an iodine number of 115–130 are considered semi-drying.

Examples of semi-drying oils
Corn oil
Cottonseed oil
Sesame oil
Grape seed oil
Sunflower oil

See also
Painting oil
Seasoning cast iron

References

Visual arts materials
Painting materials
Oils